Torban (Khetri Leikai) is a census town in Imphal East district in the Indian state of Manipur.

Demographics
 India census, Torban (Khetri Leikai) had a population of 4553. Males constitute 48% of the population and females 52%. Torban (Khetri Leikai) has an average literacy rate of 83%, higher than the national average of 59.5%: male literacy is 90%, and female literacy is 76%. In Torban (Khetri Leikai), 9% of the population is under 6 years of age.

References

Cities and towns in Imphal East district
Imphal East district